Statistics of Primera División Uruguaya for the 1995 season.

Overview
It was contested by 13 teams, and Peñarol won the championship.

Apertura

Clausura

Overall

Playoff
Peñarol 1-0 ; 1-2 ; 3-1 Nacional
Peñarol won the championship.

References
Uruguay - List of final tables (RSSSF)

Uruguayan Primera División seasons
1995 in Uruguayan football
Uru